No Thank You may refer to:
 No Thank You, a 2001 album by Japanese rock band Coaltar of the Deepers
 No, Thank You!!!, a 2013 BL visual novel
 No Thank You (album), a 2022 album by British rapper Little Simz
 No, Thank You, a South Korean series released through KakaoTV
 ‎No Thank You, a 2018 album by Kyle Falconer

See also 
No Thanks (disambiguation)